W. "Cannonball" Johnson was a professional baseball outfielder who played in the Negro leagues between 1919 and 1923.

Johnson made his professional debut in 1919 with the Brooklyn Royal Giants and the Bacharach Giants. He went on to play three seasons with the Lincoln Giants, and finished his career in 1923 with the Harrisburg Giants.

References

External links
  and Seamheads

Place of birth missing
Place of death missing
Year of birth missing
Year of death missing
Bacharach Giants players
Brooklyn Royal Giants players
Harrisburg Giants players
Lincoln Giants players
Baseball outfielders